Curtis Counce (January 23, 1926 – July 31, 1963) was an American hard bop and West Coast jazz double bassist.

Biography
Counce was born in Kansas City, Missouri and moved to California in 1945.  He began recording in 1946 with Lester Young, and in the 1950s in Los Angeles with musicians such as Shorty Rogers, Stan Kenton, Shelly Manne, Lyle Murphy, Teddy Charles, and Clifford Brown.  Counce formed his quintet in 1956 featuring tenor saxophonist Harold Land, trumpeter Jack Sheldon, pianist Carl Perkins and drummer Frank Butler.  Elmo Hope replaced Perkins after his death at age 29 in 1958.  Gerald Wilson replaced Sheldon on some recordings.  The four albums originally released on Contemporary Records were reissued in 2006 on a double CD by Gambit Spain. Counce died in Los Angeles, California, of a heart attack. He was survived by his wife, Mildred Counce, his daughter, Celeste Counce, and a son. Counce's son, born April 10, 1961, was placed for adoption by his biological mother.   Curtis knew of his son, but due to his life circumstances, Counce could not be a part of his life.  Curtis's son died on January 23, 2022.

Discography

As leader
 The Curtis Counce Group (Contemporary, 1957)
 You Get More Bounce with Curtis Counce! (Contemporary, 1957)
 Exploring the Future (Dootone, 1958)
 Carl's Blues (Contemporary, 1960)
 Sonority (Contemporary, 1989)

As sideman
With Maynard Ferguson
 Dimensions (EmArcy, 1955)
 Maynard Ferguson's Hollywood Party (EmArcy, 1954)
 Stratospheric (Mercury, 1976)

With Herb Geller
 Herb Geller Plays (EmArcy, 1954)
 Jazz Studio 2 from Hollywood (Decca, 1954)
 Jazz Studio 2 from Hollywood Part II (Brunswick, 1954)

With Shorty Rogers
 Cool and Crazy (RCA Victor, 1953)
 Shorty Rogers Courts the Count (RCA Victor, 1954)
 The Swinging Mr. Rogers (Atlantic, 1955)
 Collaboration  (RCA Victor, 1955)
 Shorty Rogers and His Giants (RCA Victor, 1956)
 The Big Shorty Rogers Express (RCA Victor, 1956)
 Way Up There (Atlantic, 1957)
 Martians Stay Home (Atlantic, 1980)

With others
 Chet Baker & Art Pepper,  Playboys (World Pacific, 1957)
 Clifford Brown, Clifford Brown All Stars (EmArcy, 1956)
 Teddy Charles, Collaboration West (Prestige, 1956)
 Teddy Charles, Evolution (Prestige, 1957)
 Buddy Collette & Chico Hamilton, Tanganyika (Dig, 1956)
 Maxwell Davis, Compositions of Duke Ellington and Others (Crown, 1960)
 Buddy DeFranco, Generalissimo (Verve, 1958)
 Herbie Fields, Blow Hot Blow Cool (Decca, 1955)
 Jimmy Giuffre, Jimmy Giuffre (Capitol, 1954)
 Bill Holman, Bill Holman (Capitol, 1954)
 Illinois Jacquet, Illinois Jacquet and His Orchestra (Clef, 1957)
 Pete Jolly, I Get a Kick Out of You (RCA, 1955)
 Pete Jolly, Jolly Jumps In (RCA Victor, 1955)
 Stan Kenton, Cuban Fire! (Capitol, 1956)
 Shelly Manne, The West Coast Sound (Contemporary, 1956)
 Lyle Murphy, 12-Tone Compositions & Arrangements (Contemporary, 1955)
 Lyle Murphy, New Orbits in Sound (GNP, 1958)
 Johnny Otis, Willie and the Hand Jive  (Capitol, 1958)
 Max Roach, Herb Geller, Walter Benton, Joe Maini, Clifford Brown, Best Coast Jazz (Mercury/EmArcy, 1956)
 Frank Rosolino, That Old Black Magic (Capitol, 1954)
 Frank Rosolino, Frank Rosolino (Capitol, 1956)
 John Williams, Plays the Music of Harold Arlen (Discovery, 1984)
 Claude Williamson, Salute to Bud (Capitol, 1954)
 Lester Young, Swinging Lester Young (Score, 1957)

References

Further reading 
 Richard Morton and Brian Cook, The Penguin Guide to Jazz on CD, London, Penguin, 2nd Edition, 1994 & 6th Edition, 2002

External links 

American jazz double-bassists
Male double-bassists
Cool jazz double-bassists
Hard bop double-bassists
West Coast jazz double-bassists
Jazz musicians from California
Musicians from Los Angeles
1926 births
1963 deaths
20th-century American musicians
20th-century double-bassists
20th-century American male musicians
American male jazz musicians
Musicians from Kansas City, Missouri